The R569 road is a regional road in County Kerry, Ireland. It travels from the N71 road at Kenmare to the N22, via the village of Kilgarvan. The road follows the course of the Roughty River for the greater part of its route.

References

Regional roads in the Republic of Ireland
Roads in County Kerry